is a manga series written and illustrated by Shiho Takase.

Publication
Internet Shopping Prince Yoshimi Ida was first released as serial in Monthly Comic Zenon between December 25, 2010, and May 25, 2016. The individual chapters were then released by Tokuma Shoten into seven tankōbon (collected volumes) from November 19, 2011, to July 20, 2016.

Three chapters of a spin-off manga titled  have been published on Zenon sister magazine, Web Comic Zenyon, since June 29, 2014.

The series also inspired the publication of a recipe book of food featured in the manga; it was published by Pia on September 30, 2014.

Television drama
The manga was adapted into a Japanese television drama, which ran for ten episodes on Nagoya TV from April 27, 2013, to July 6, 2013. The series was released on DVD by Pony Canyon on October 2, 2013, in two formats: a box set containing all episodes and four rental Region 2 DVDs.

Reception
The first four volumes of Internet Shopping Prince Yoshimi Ida sold 300,00 copies. Volumes 5 and 6 of the manga appeared on Oricon's weekly chart of the best-selling manga; the former appeared in the 32nd place for selling 35,950 copies, while the latter placed 33rd and sold 44,341 copies.

References

External links
Manga official website  (in Japanese)

Cooking in anime and manga
Comedy anime and manga
Tokuma Shoten manga
Seinen manga